Diego Portales Airport  is an airport serving La Ligua, a town in the Valparaíso Region of Chile.

There is high terrain north through southeast of the airport.

See also

Transport in Chile
List of airports in Chile

References

External links
OpenStreetMap - Diego Portales
OurAirports - Diego Portales
FallingRain - Diego Portales Airport

Airports in Valparaíso Region